The Speaker of the American Samoa House of Representatives is the presiding officer of that legislature.

Below is a list of office-holders from 1967:

Sources
Sunia, Fofō I. F. (1998). The Story of the Legislature of American Samoa: In Commemoration of the Golden Jubilee 1948-1998. Pago Pago, AS: Legislature of American Samoa. .
Various editions of The Europa World Year Book

Politics of American Samoa
American Samoa